Aspidontus dussumieri, the lance blenny or Dussumier's blenny, is a species of combtooth blenny found in coral reefs in the Pacific and Indian Oceans. The specific name honours the French explorer and merchant Jean-Jacques Dussumier (1792-1883).

References

dussumieri
Taxa named by Achille Valenciennes
Fish described in 1836